Suzete Montalvão (born 17 February 1965) is a Brazilian sprinter. She competed in the women's 4 × 400 metres relay at the 1988 Summer Olympics.

References

1965 births
Living people
Athletes (track and field) at the 1988 Summer Olympics
Brazilian female sprinters
Olympic athletes of Brazil
Place of birth missing (living people)
Olympic female sprinters